The 1999 Billboard Music Awards took place on December 8, 1999, at the MGM Grand Garden Arena in Las Vegas. Hosted by Kathy Griffin and Adam Carolla, the ceremony honored the best-performing music releases between December 1998 and November 1999, and their respective artists.

Britney Spears was both the most-nominated and most-awarded artist of the year, winning five awards including Top New Artist and Top Female Artist. Country singer and songwriter Emmylou Harris was bestowed with the Century Award in honour of her many creative achievements, while Aerosmith received the Artist Achievement Award for their longstanding body of work. Garth Brooks and Mariah Carey were recipients of the inaugural Male and Female Artist of the Decade awards respectively. The Red Hot Chili Peppers were presented with a special award for their single "Scar Tissue", which set the then-all-time record for most weeks at number-one on Billboards Hot Modern Rock Tracks chart earlier in the year.

Performances

Presenters 
 ZZ Top – presented R&B Albums Artist of the Year

Winners and nominees 
Britney Spears was the most-nominated artist with eight nominations, followed by TLC who received six. R. Kelly and Cher tied with five nominations apiece, while Whitney Houston, Shania Twain, Jay-Z, and the Backstreet Boys each earned four.

Winners are listed first and highlighted in bold.

References

1999
Billboard awards
1999 music awards
1999 in American music
MGM Grand Garden Arena